Peter Dobkin Hall (February 22, 1946 – April 30, 2015) was an American author and historian. He was Professor of History and Theory in the School of Public Affairs at  Baruch College, City University of New York, and Senior Research Fellow at the Harvard Kennedy School's Hauser Center for Nonprofit Organizations.

Biography
Hall was born to David Hall, recorded sound archivist, and Bernice Dobkin. He received his BA in American Studies at Reed College in 1968 and his MA (1970) and PhD (1973) in American History from the State University of New York at Stony Brook.

Hall held appointments at Wesleyan (1974-1982), Yale (1983-1999), and Harvard (since 2000). He was a founding member of Yale's Program on Non-Profit Organizations and served as its director from 1996 to 1999. In 1993, Hall received the John Grenzebach Award for Outstanding Research in Philanthropy for Education from the AAFRC Trust for Philanthropy and the Council for Advancement and Support of Education. In 2008, he was given the ARNOVA Award for Distinguished Achievement in Nonprofit and Voluntary Action Research.

Hall edited the Hauser Center blog, Nonprofit News & Comment, a weekly survey of major press coverage of philanthropy, nonprofits, and related topics. Active in historic preservation, he was a co-founder of the New Haven Urban Design League and a trustee of the New Haven Museum.

On April 30, 2015, Hall was killed in a head-on car collision after he traveled the wrong way on Interstate 95 near Branford, Connecticut.

Bibliography
The Organization of American Culture, 1700-1900: Institutions, Elites, and the Origins of American Nationality (1982)  (paperback)
With Karyl Lee Kibler Hall, The Lehigh Valley: An Illustrated History (1982)  (hardcover)
Inventing the Nonprofit Sector and Other Essays on Philanthropy, Voluntarism, and Nonprofit Organizations (1992)  (paperback)
Co-edited with N.J. Demerath III, Rhys H. Williams, & Terry Schmitt, Sacred Companies: Organizational Aspects of Religion and Religious Aspects of Organizations (1998)  (hardcover).
Co-editor with Colin B. Burke, of the chapter on nonprofit organizations, voluntary associations, and religious entities in "Historical Statistics of the United States, Millennial Edition" (2006)

See also
Hauser Center for Nonprofit Organizations

References

External links
Peter Dobkin Hall's personal home page

American historians of religion
American male non-fiction writers
Harvard University faculty
Reed College alumni
Stony Brook University alumni
Yale University faculty
1946 births
2015 deaths
Road incident deaths in Connecticut
20th-century American historians
21st-century American historians
20th-century American male writers
21st-century American male writers